Rolf Tschiemer (born 23 October 1951) is a retired Swiss professional ice hockey forward who played for SCL Tigers in the National League A. He also represented the Swiss national team at the 1976 Winter Olympics.

References

External links

1951 births
Living people
Swiss ice hockey forwards
SCL Tigers players
Ice hockey players at the 1976 Winter Olympics
Olympic ice hockey players of Switzerland